The Men's Downhill in the 2020 FIS Alpine Skiing World Cup consisted of nine events, with only one cancellation from the scheduled ten. 

Swiss skier Beat Feuz won his third consecutive season title in this discipline, just missing clinching the title with two races to go after finishing second at Saalbach-Hinterglemm and opening a 194-point lead over Germany's Thomas Dreßen, and then finally clinching the title in the next race by finishing fourth at Kvitfjell. 

However, the final race, which had been scheduled for Wednesday, 18 March as part of the season finals in Cortina d'Ampezzo, Italy, was cancelled due to the COVID-19 pandemic.

Standings

DNF = Did Not Finish
DNS = Did Not Start

See also
 2020 Alpine Skiing World Cup – Men's summary rankings
 2020 Alpine Skiing World Cup – Men's Overall
 2020 Alpine Skiing World Cup – Men's Super-G
 2020 Alpine Skiing World Cup – Men's Giant Slalom
 2020 Alpine Skiing World Cup – Men's Slalom
 2020 Alpine Skiing World Cup – Men's Combined
 2020 Alpine Skiing World Cup – Men's Parallel
 World Cup scoring system

References

External links
 Alpine Skiing at FIS website

External links
 

Men's Downhill
FIS Alpine Ski World Cup men's downhill discipline titles